Kashal-e Azad Sara (also Romanized as Kashal-e Āzād Sarā; also known as Kashal) is a village in Kurka Rural District, in the Central District of Astaneh-ye Ashrafiyeh County, Gilan Province, Iran. At the 2006 census, its population was 746, in 216 families.

References 

Populated places in Astaneh-ye Ashrafiyeh County